Yanhe is a Chinese Vocaloid developed formerly by Bplats, Inc. under the Yamaha Corporation, and was created in collaboration with Shanghai Henian Information Technology Co. Ltd. She was released for the Vocaloid 3 engine. Her voice is provided by a female Chinese voice actress Seira Ryū. It was announced on the 9th Chinese International Cartoon and Game Expo (CCG) on July 11, 2013.

Characteristics

See also 
 List of Vocaloid products

External links 
 Visnger official page (in Chinese)
 Official Weibo of Yanhe Project (in Chinese)

Vocaloids introduced in 2013